The 2021 Liga 3 Gorontalo will be the fourth season of Liga 3 Gorontalo as a qualifying round for the national round of the 2021–22 Liga 3.

Persidago Gorontalo were the defending champion.

Teams
There are 24 teams participated in the league this season.

Abdi United
Basmi
Boliyohuto
Bonebol
Dulamayo
Dulupi
FC Gorut
IPPOT Bolango
Kreasindo
Lakeya
Likot
Mahardika
Muara Tirta
Paguyaman All Star
Paguyaman Pantai All Star
Panipi Raya
Panua GFC
Persidago Gorontalo
Persital
PS Boalemo
PSP Pohuwato
Rajawali Gorontalo
Sparadis United
Telaga Biru

Group stages

Group A

Group B

Second round

Third round

Group C

Group D

Final

References

Liga 3